Moon and Sand is an album recorded by Kenny Burrell at Coast Records in December 1979. The album was initially released on the Concord Jazz label. The record is considered unusual in Burrell's catalog for the amount of acoustic guitar playing he provided at these sessions.

Track listing

Personnel
Kenny Burrell - Electric and acoustic guitars.
John Heard - Bass
Roy McCurdy - Drums
Kenneth Nash - Percussion

References

1979 albums
Kenny Burrell albums